The Fullmetal Alchemist light novels are based on the manga series of the same name by Hiromu Arakawa. Fullmetal Alchemist began serialization in Square Enix's monthly manga anthology Monthly Shonen Gangan its August 2001 issue and concluded in June 2010. Square Enix has published a series of six light novel adaptations based on the series, all written by Makoto Inoue with illustrations provided by Arakawa. The novels follow the Elric brothers on their continued quest for the Philosopher's Stone. The first novel of the series, Fullmetal Alchemist: The Land of Sand, was used as the source material for episodes 11 and 12 of the first Fullmetal Alchemist anime adaptation.

The first novel was published in February 2003, and the sixth in March 2007. Square Enix has also published novelizations of their three Fullmetal Alchemist PlayStation 2 action role-playing video games: Fullmetal Alchemist and the Broken Angel, Curse of the Crimson Elixir, and The Girl Who Succeeds God and two Wii games: Prince of the Dawn and Daughter of the Dusk (in one volume). The first novel was written by Makoto Inoue; the next two by Jun Eishima, and the last by Sōji Machida. However, none of these have been published in English.

Viz Media acquired the license for an English language release of the light novel series simultaneously with the license for the original manga. The Fullmetal Alchemist novels were one of the premiere titles for Viz's new Fiction imprint and were translated by Alexander O. Smith. The first five novels were released in North America from October 2005 to December 2007. The sixth novel, translated by Jan Mitsuko Cash and Asumi Shibata, was released in October 2021. Starting from December 2021 re-release of The Land of Sand, Viz published second editions of the first five light novels with new cover designs, and unlike the original releases they are also available digitally. The new release concluded with the new edition of The Ties That Bind in September 2022.



Volume list

Light novels

Video game novelizations

Reception
The first Fullmetal Alchemist novel, The Land of the Sand, was well received by Jarred Pine of Mania Entertainment as a self-contained novelization that remained true to the characterizations of the manga series. He said that while the lack of backstory aims it more towards fans of the franchise than new readers, it was an impressive debut piece for the Viz Fiction line. Ain't It Cool News also found the novel to be true to its roots, and said that while it added nothing new, it was compelling enough for followers of the series to enjoy a retelling. The reviewer said it was a "work for young-ish readers that's pretty clear about some darker sides of politics, economics and human nature". Charles Solomon of the Los Angeles Times said that the novel has a different focus than the anime series; The Land of Sand "created a stronger, sympathetic bond" between the younger brothers than is seen in its two-episode anime counterpart.

References

External links
 Official Gangan Fullmetal Alchemist manga and novel website  

Fullmetal Alchemist
Fullmetal Alchemist